Etherdwick is a hamlet in the East Riding of Yorkshire, England in an area known as Holderness.

The hamlet forms part of the civil parish of Aldbrough.

In 1823 Bulmer's Topography, History and Directory of East Yorkshire wrote Etherdwick's name as "Etherdwicke". At the time it was in the Wapentake and Liberty of Holderness. Recorded in the hamlet were three farmers.

References

External links

Villages in the East Riding of Yorkshire
Holderness